The 1933 season of the Mitropa Cup football club tournament was won by Austria Wien who defeated AS Ambrosiana Inter 4-3 on aggregate in the final. It was the third time that a team from Vienna won the tournament, but the first of two wins for FK Austria Wien. The two legs were played on 3 September in San Siro stadium and 8 September in Prater Stadium. 

The holders, AGC Bologna, had failed to qualify as one of the two Italian clubs. It was the last time that Ferencvárosi FC failed to qualify as one of the Hungarian clubs for the pre-war competition. This was the seventh edition of the tournament.

The accolade of top scorer was shared by four players who each scored five goals, Raimundo Orsi of semi-finalists Juventus, František Kloz of the other semi-finalists Sparta Prague, Giuseppe Meazza who scored one goal in each leg of the final for AS Ambrosiana Inter, and Matthias Sindelar who scored all three of FK Austria Wien's goals in the second leg of the final, the third, which was the winner, in the 88th minute.

Quarterfinals

|}

Semifinals

 
|}

Finals

|}

Top goalscorers

External links 
 Mitropa Cup results at Rec.Sport.Soccer Statistics Foundation

References

1933–34
1933–34 in European football
1933–34 in Austrian football
1933–34 in Italian football
1933–34 in Czechoslovak football
1933–34 in Hungarian football